The 2014 Australian Short Course Swimming Championships were held from 5 to 9 November 2014 at the South Australia Aquatic and Leisure Centre in Adelaide, South Australia. They doubled up as the national trials for the 2014 FINA World Swimming Championships (25 m) in Doha, Qatar.

Events
A total of 63 events (31 each for men and women and 1 mixed event) were contested:
Freestyle: 50, 100, 200, 400, 800 and 1,500;
Backstroke: 50, 100 and 200;
Breaststroke: 50, 100 and 200;
Butterfly: 50, 100 and 200;
Individual medley: 100, 200 and 400;
Relays: 4×100 free, 4×200 free; 4×100 medley

Schedule

M = Morning session, E = Evening session

Qualification criteria
Below were the entry qualifying times for each event that had to be achieved after 1 January 2013 in a 25 metre pool. A time in a 50 metre pool could only be used without a conversion factor when a short course time was not available. Entrants had to be a minimum of 12 years of age as of the first day of the meet.

Below were the men's entry multiclass qualifying times for each event.

Below were the women's entry multiclass qualifying times for each event.

Medal winners

Men's events

Men's multiclass events

Women's events

Women's multiclass events

Mixed events

Team selection
A team of 20 was selected for the 2014 FINA World Swimming Championships (25 m) in Doha, Qatar.
Matthew Abood, Bronte Campbell, Tommaso D'Orsogna, Ellen Fullerton, Katie Goldman, Jordan Harrison, Sally Hunter, Grant Irvine, Mitch Larkin, Travis Mahoney, Cameron McEvoy, David Morgan, Leah Neale, Jake Packard, Kylie Palmer, Leiston Pickett, Emily Seebohm, Daniel Smith, Brianna Throssell and Madison Wilson.

References

Short Course Swimming Championships
Australian short course championships
Australian Short Course Swimming Championships
Sports competitions in Adelaide
November 2014 sports events in Australia
2010s in Adelaide